Kurs Valüt is a Ukrainian EBM/synth-pop band from Dnipro, which was founded in 2017 by Yevhen Hordieyev.

History and style 
The project's name Kurs Valüt means exchange rate in Ukrainian, it was used as a nickname for a party featuring Odesa-based band Klymentovo Pole. That set Hordieyev played with Stas Koroliov (known also for the project YuKo).

Kurs Valüt texts contain mentions of cultural phenomena, patterns and memes often discussed in Ukrainian medias and social networks ("покращення" ("improvement" was slogan of Viktor Yanukovych presidential campaign in 2010), "швидкогроші" ("fast money" is a popular network of fast credits), "інтерсіті" (intercity trains were a hot news when firstly appeared), "здобули" ("we won" or "we attained" was a meme with an opposite meaning from Euromaidan times)), also many constructions from the journalist language of television. Music also contains similar hints. For example, the song 4533 uses the sound of voting in Verkhovna Rada and the song Love inspektor uses the green light sound of Dnipro traffic lights.

Some texts are written by Ukrainian classics like Hryhoriy Skovoroda (Kurs Valüt) and Pavlo Tychyna (Veselo).

Kurs Valüt uses Latin alphabet in stylization.

Hordieyev described the project as follow: "Kurs Valüt is rather a study of pop pherment, a try to invent an unusual musical and textual solution without cliche. Refusal instead of suggestion, coldness instead of carnaval."

Discography 
 Veselo (2018)
 Kurs Valüt (2021)

References

External links 
 Soundcloud
 The Dark Dnipropop of Ukrainian EBM Duo Kurs Valüt’s “Karantin” – post-punk.com
 KURS VALÜT at no-emb-blanc.com

Electronic music groups
Musical groups established in 2017
Ukrainian electronic musicians
2017 establishments in Ukraine